Fletcher Nunatak is the hill rising to 150 m at the base of the small peninsula ending in Avitohol Point on the north coast of Livingston Island in the South Shetland Islands, Antarctica. It has a partly ice-free area of 0.54 ha extending 100 m in southwest–northeast direction and 60 m in southeast–northwest direction. The nunatk surmounts Hero Bay on the northeast, and is part of the glacial divide between Tundzha Glacier on the southeast and Berkovitsa Glacier on the west. The area was visited by early 19th century sealers.

The feature is named after the American woman land surveyor Alice Cunningham Fletcher (1838-1923), in association with other names in the area deriving from the early development or use of geodetic instruments and methods.

Location

Maps

 Livingston Island to King George Island. Scale 1:200000.  Admiralty Nautical Chart 1776.  Taunton: UK Hydrographic Office, 1968
 South Shetland Islands. Scale 1:200000 topographic map No. 3373. DOS 610 - W 62 58. Tolworth, UK, 1968
 L. Ivanov. Antarctica: Livingston Island and Greenwich, Robert, Snow and Smith Islands. Scale 1:120000 topographic map. Troyan: Manfred Wörner Foundation, 2010.  (First edition 2009. )
 L. Ivanov. Antarctica: Livingston Island and Smith Island. Scale 1:100000 topographic map. Manfred Wörner Foundation, 2017. 
 Antarctic Digital Database (ADD). Scale 1:250000 topographic map of Antarctica. Scientific Committee on Antarctic Research (SCAR). Since 1993, regularly upgraded and updated

Notes

References
 Bulgarian Antarctic Gazetteer. Antarctic Place-names Commission. (details in Bulgarian, basic data in English)

External links
 Fletcher Nunatak. Adjusted Copernix satellite image

Nunataks of Livingston Island
Bulgaria and the Antarctic